Acacia deuteroneura is a shrub belonging to the genus Acacia and the subgenus Phyllodineae that is endemic to Queensland. It was listed as vulnerable according to the Environment Protection and Biodiversity Conservation Act 1999 in 2008.

Description
When it blooms around August it produces spherical flower-heads containing 20 to 30 yellow flowers.

Distribution
Only around 100 specimens were observed at the site in 1973.

See also
 List of Acacia species

References

deuteroneura
Flora of Queensland
Plants described in 1980
Taxa named by Leslie Pedley